The 1851 Georgia gubernatorial election was held on October 6, 1851.

The Constitutional Union Candidate, Howell Cobb defeated the Southern Rights Candidate, Charles McDonald.

Governor Howell Cobb became the first and only Constitutional Union Governor of Georgia.

General election

Results

References 

Georgia (U.S. state) gubernatorial elections
Georgia
Georgia